The Croatia national futsal team represents Croatia during international futsal competitions and is controlled by the Croatian Football Federation and represents the country in international futsal competitions, such as the FIFA Futsal World Cup and the European Championships.

Results

FIFA Futsal World Cup

UEFA European Futsal Championship

Grand Prix de Futsal

Confederations Cup

Futsal Mundialito

Mediterranean Cup

*Denotes draws include knockout matches decided on penalty kicks.

Players

Current squad

Results and fixtures

2013

2014

Notable players

Player statistics
As of 30 January 2022

Most appearances

Top scorers

Record against other teams
As of 30 January 2022

Biggest Wins

Biggest Losses

References

External links
 CROfutsal 
 HRfutsal.com 
 Croatia Mediterranean Futsal champions 2010  (Last updated November 10, 2010)
 Detailed list of all Croatia's games  (Last updated July 1, 2009)

 
European national futsal teams
national